Over the Air was an annual mobile technology-focused overnight hack day event held in London from 2008 to 2016. The two-day event would include practical and educational talks and a hacking competition.  Sponsors of the event have included the BBC, Bluevia, Nokia, PayPal, and Vodafone. Some of the ideas developed at Over the Air have been turned into commercial services.

History

Over the Air developed from previous hack day events in 2007 and 2008.

From 2008 to 2010, the event was held at Imperial College in South Kensington. The 2011 version of Over the Air was part of the 2011 London Mobile Week. From 2011 to 2013, it was held at Bletchley Park. There was no Over the Air event in 2014.

In 2015, the event was held at St John the Baptist, Hoxton; on 25 and 26 September. It featured one of the first workshop sessions  for the Micro Bit; along with the usual hackathon and lightning talks. The 8th (and final) event was also St. John's, on 25 and 26 November 2016.

References

External links

BBC New Media
2008 conferences
2009 conferences
2010 conferences
2011 conferences
2012 conferences
2014 conferences
2015 conferences
2016 conferences
Hacker culture
Meetings
Mobile phone culture
Mobile software development
Mobile telecommunications
Software development events
Unconferences
Vodafone